The light welterweight competition at the 2015 AIBA World Boxing Championships will be held from 6–14 October 2015. This is a qualifying tournament for the upcoming 2016 Summer Olympics. Arlen Lopez of Cuba defeated Bektemir Melikuziev of Uzbekistan to win the world title.

Medalists

Seeds

  Arlen Lopez
  Zhanibek Alimkhanuly (quarterfinals)
  Petr Khamukov (quarterfinals)
  Tomasz Jablonski (round of 16)

Draw

Finals

Section 1

Section 2

Results

Ranking

References

External links
Official website

2015 AIBA World Boxing Championships